West Burlington is a city in Des Moines County, Iowa, United States, adjacent to the Mississippi River city of Burlington. The population was 2,968 at the 2010 census. It is part of the Burlington, IA–IL Micropolitan Statistical Area.

Geography
West Burlington is located at  (40.820318, -91.164492).

Demographics

2010 census
As of the census of 2010, there were 2,968 people, 1,372 households, and 800 families living in the city. The racial makeup of the city was 90.7% White, 4.1% African American, 0.3% Native American, 1.8% Asian, 0.1% Pacific Islander, 1.0% from other races, and 2.0% from two or more races. Hispanic or Latino of any race were 3.9% of the population.

There were 1,372 households, of which 25.2% had children under the age of 18 living with them, 41.7% were married couples living together, 12.6% had a female householder with no husband present, 4.0% had a male householder with no wife present, and 41.7% were non-families. 36.8% of all households were made up of individuals, and 15.8% had someone living alone who was 65 years of age or older. The average household size was 2.12 and the average family size was 2.76.

The median age in the city was 44.4 years. 20.2% of residents were under the age of 18; 9.1% were between the ages of 18 and 24; 21.4% were from 25 to 44; 29.5% were from 45 to 64; and 19.9% were 65 years of age or older. The gender makeup of the city was 46.9% male and 53.1% female.

2000 census
As of the census of 2000, there were 3,161 people, 1,434 households, and 871 families living in the city. The racial makeup of the city was 94.72% White, 2.50% African American, 0.06% Native American, 1.04% Asian, 0.57% from other races, and 1.11% from two or more races. Hispanic or Latino of any race were 3.07% of the population.

There were 1,434 households, out of which 25.4% had children under the age of 18 living with them, 45.9% were married couples living together, 11.4% had a female householder with no husband present, and 39.2% were non-families. 34.4% of all households were made up of individuals, and 15.6% had someone living alone who was 65 years of age or older. The average household size was 2.18 and the average family size was 2.77.

In the city the population was spread out, with 21.0% under the age of 18, 10.1% from 18 to 24, 24.7% from 25 to 44, 25.1% from 45 to 64, and 19.0% who were 65 years of age or older. The median age was 41 years. For every 100 females, there were 92.7 males. For every 100 females age 18 and over, there were 88.9 males.

The median income for a household in the city was $38,958, and the median income for a family was $45,321. Males had a median income of $34,574 versus $21,225 for females. The per capita income for the city was $19,659. About 4.4% of families and 8.2% of the population were below the poverty line, including 13.1% of those under age 18 and 2.2% of those age 65 or over.

Education
Most residents are in the West Burlington Independent School District.

Some residential developments to the west are in the Burlington Community School District.

Transportation
West Burlington is the hub of Burlington Trailways, an intercity bus operator. As such, West Burlington sees numerous intercity buses operate from its bus station.

References

External links
 City website

Cities in Des Moines County, Iowa